Great Emperor may refer to:

Chinese mythology
 Great Emperor of Jade, a name of the Jade Emperor
 Great Emperor of Medicine, a name of Shennong ( Shennong the Great Emperor)
 Great Emperor of Polaris, a sky deity in Taoism

Other uses
 Great Emperor, a rescue tug that towed 
 Great Khan, a translation of Yekhe Khagan
 Kwanggeto Taewang, a 2004 animated film by South Korean director Kim Cheong-gi
 Maha Chakkraphat, 16th-century king of the Ayutthaya Kingdom